is a passenger railway station located in the city of Tokushima, Tokushima Prefecture, Japan. It is operated by JR Shikoku and has the station number "M03".

Lines
Only local trains stop at the station.

Layout
The station consists of a side platform serving a single track on a concrete embankment above the surrounding farmland. There is no station building, only a shelter on the platform and a ticket vending machine. A flight of steps leads up to the platform from the access road. A bike shed and a public telephone call box are located at the base of the stairs.

Adjacent stations

History
Bunkanomori Station was opened by JR Shikoku on 3 November 1990 as an added station on the existing Mugi Line.

Passenger statistics
In fiscal 2019, the station was used by an average of 151 passengers daily

Surrounding area
Tokushima Prefectural Cultural Forest Comprehensive Park

See also
List of railway stations in Japan

References

External links

 JR Shikoku timetable

Railway stations in Tokushima Prefecture
Railway stations in Japan opened in 1990
Tokushima (city)